Hyperthaema haemacta is a moth of the subfamily Arctiinae. It was described by Schaus in 1901. It is found in Costa Rica.

References

Phaegopterina
Moths described in 1901